Nuq (also Romanized as Nūq, Nūgh, and Nūk; also known as Deh-e Nūq) is a village in Jazin Rural District, in the Central District of Bajestan County, Razavi Khorasan Province, Iran. At the 2006 census, its population was 828, in 237 families.

References 

Populated places in Bajestan County